Mountainous Landscape with Figures and a Donkey (Polish: Krajobraz piaszczysty) is an oil on panel painting by Flemish painter Joos de Momper. The painting is currently housed at the National Museum in Warsaw.

The painting was completed in the early 17th century. It was acquired by the National Museum of Warsaw in 1917.

References

Sources
 
 
 Jan Białostocki, Maria Murdzeńska, Danuta Książkiewicz, Jan Kuglin (1969). Catalogue of paintings: foreign schools. Vol. 1. National Museum in Warsaw, cat. no. 833, p. 280

External links
Painting at the National Museum of Warsaw

16th-century paintings
17th-century paintings
Landscape paintings
Paintings by Joos de Momper
Paintings in the collection of the National Museum, Warsaw